is a former Japanese rugby union player. He played as lock.

Career
Tanuma attended Nippon Sport Science University, for whose club he played and won the Kanto Taikosen league university championship in 1995. In 1996 he graduated and joined Ricoh, where he played 14 consecutive seasons until his retirement as player in 2010. Tanuma was first capped for Japan against South Korea, in Taipei, on 9 November 1996. He also played three matches in the 1999 Rugby World Cup and played only one match in the 2003 Rugby World Cup, against France, in Townsville, on 18 October, which would be his last cap for Japan. Tanuma also played in the Japan Sevens team, where he played the 1997 Rugby World Cup Sevens. After his retirement in 2010, he coached Ricoh Black Rams and then, Nippon Sport Science University Rugby Football Club.

Notes

External links

1973 births
Living people
Japanese rugby union players
Japanese rugby sevens players
Japanese rugby union coaches
Rugby union locks
Japan international rugby union players
Japan international rugby sevens players
Black Rams Tokyo players
Asian Games medalists in rugby union
Rugby union players at the 1998 Asian Games
Rugby union players at the 2002 Asian Games
Asian Games silver medalists for Japan
Medalists at the 1998 Asian Games
Medalists at the 2002 Asian Games